National Coalition Against Domestic Violence (NCADV) is a 501(c)(3) nonprofit organization with the mission to be the voice of victims and survivors of domestic violence. Based in Denver, Colorado. National Coalition Against Domestic Violence's vision is to create a culture where domestic violence is not tolerated and where society empowers victims and survivors while holding abusers accountable.

Current Work

Legislative Policy Advocacy
National Coalition Against Domestic Violence works with members of Congress to improve legislation dealing with domestic violence. Responding to the problem of domestic violence offenders who fight with victims for custody of their children, NCADV advocates for legislation that keeps the best interest of the children in mind.

In 1994, NCADV was part of a team to pass the Violence Against Women Act to provide funding for investigation into domestic violence and prosecution of offenders.

National Coalition Against Domestic Violence has also helped with the Family Violence Prevention and Services Act, International Violence Against Women Act, and Legislative Action Day.

Current Programs

Cosmetic and Reconstructive Support
The Cosmetic and Reconstructive Support Program was created to connect survivors of domestic violence to medical providers around the country. Pro bono services may be available to those in need of a provider to repair injuries inflicted by an abusive spouse or partner.

Currently, National Coalition Against Domestic Violence assists survivors with the application process to assure all qualifications have been met and to provide support while working diligently with several medical groups and individual providers to streamline the process. NCADV works with three provider partner groups including Reconstructing Hope, Face to Face, and Face Forward.

National Victim-Centered Biennial Conferences
National Coalition Against Domestic Violence sponsors conferences frequently in order to bring survivors and leaders together to freely speak on the topic of domestic violence and develop connections with one another. One of the most recent events was the 2016 National Coalition Against Domestic Violence Conference held October 23–26, 2016 in Chandler, Arizona.

The conference is held every two years and is a place for survivors, advocates, social workers, law enforcement, prosecutors, medical providers, and more to learn cutting-edge content and network on a national level.

Advocacy Webinars 
In 2016, National Coalition Against Domestic Violence created a series of professional advocacy webinars. NCADV's monthly webinars explore emerging issues, insights, best practices, and research from leaders in the domestic violence field. Each webinar offers an opportunity to improve an advocate's skillset and knowledge base with detailed, hands-on video training, engagingly delivered to their desk. Topics for webinars in 2018 range from effective outreach to LGBTQ survivors of abuse to the dangers and impact of strangulation to examining the global effort to end violence against women.

Survivor Speaker's Bureau 
National Coalition Against Domestic Violence's National Speakers Bureau that connects survivors to the community as well as create awareness and dialogue around issues related to domestic violence. Voices, National Coalition Against Domestic Violence's National Speakers Bureau is the platform that encourages domestic violence survivors to raise their voices to speak about the complexities of intimate partner violence. Voices helps transform the narrative surrounding domestic violence by giving the issue real faces, real voices and real stories at a grassroots level.

Current Projects

Remember My Name
In October 1994, National Coalition Against Domestic Violence teamed up with Ms. magazine to create "Remember My Name", a list of victims who have lost their lives to domestic violence.

The project records information about each victim who was killed, including their age at the time of death, the names and ages of surviving children, and the weapon used against them. The project also documents information about each perpetrator, including relationship to victim, their name, age, and sentence received.

Retaining detailed information helps defend against questions about the validity of domestic violence statistics.

Rebuilding Financially After Domestic Violence
In 2001, National Coalition Against Domestic Violence partnered with The National Endowment for Financial Education to produce a manual, titled Hope & Power for Your Personal Finances: A Rebuilding Guide Following Domestic Violence, which serves to inform and assist women who have been victims of domestic violence to regain financial freedom in their lives. This program deals with topics including budgeting, banking, lending, dealing with workplace abuse, and identity theft.

In 2016, NCADV and National Endowment for Financial Education expanded the financial education program to include free webinars for victims and survivors of domestic violence as well as the advocates who serve them. Topics covered in 2018 ranged from transitional housing to financial stability to retirement planning for survivors and advocates.

Take a Stand for Healthy Relationships 
Take A Stand FOR Healthy Relationships teaches students how to understand and build healthy relationships. New standards-aligned curriculum will encourage important skills in communication, self-awareness, and emotional intelligence. With self-paced modules and lesson plans, students will garner important skills in communication, self-awareness and emotional intelligence to help them build healthy relationships. Accompanying educator guides provide school staff with strategies to support students through the critical content.

Disarm Domestic Violence 
National Coalition Against Domestic Violence, the Educational Fund to Stop Gun Violence, the Alliance for Gun Responsibility Foundation, and the Prosecutors Against Gun Violence have teamed up to launch a new initiative: Disarm Domestic Violence. The Disarm Domestic Violence website is intended to allow advocates, gun violence prevention activists, survivors, victims, law enforcement officers, prosecutors, and others to research state-specific laws on domestic violence-related protective order firearm removals and take steps to remove guns from armed abusers.

Past Accomplishments

Domestic Violence Awareness Month
Domestic Violence Awareness Month (DVAM) evolved from the Day of Unity held in October 1981. The three themes of mourning those who have died because of domestic violence, celebrating those who have survived, and connecting those who work to end violence remain a strong focus of DVAM events today.

In October 1987, the first Domestic Violence Awareness Month was observed.

Congress designated October as DVAM in 1989. Such legislation has passed every year since with National Coalition Against Domestic Violence providing key leadership.

Day of Unity
National Coalition Against Domestic Violence conceived the first annual Day of Unity in 1981. The intent was to connect advocates across the nation who were working to end violence against women and their children. The activities conducted were varied but had common themes:

 Mourning those who have died because of domestic violence
 Celebrating those who have survived
 Connecting those who work to end violence 

The Day of Unity soon became an entire week devoted to a range of activities conducted at the local, state, and national level.

Each year, the Day of Unity is celebrated the first Monday of Domestic Violence Awareness Month.

Media
National Coalition Against Domestic Violence creates public service announcements to help increase awareness of domestic violence and help people affected by it to call the National Domestic Violence Hotline at 1-800-799-SAFE (7233).

History
National Coalition Against Domestic Violence began at the United States Commission on Civil Rights hearing on battered women. Beginning as 100 individuals, it became thousands of members working together and sharing their experiences with domestic violence, homophobia, sexism, racism, and ageism. NCADV was officially incorporated as a nonprofit organization on September 22, 1978.

See also
Outline of domestic violence
Post-assault treatment of victims of sexual assault
Violence against women

References

External links

Disarm Domestic Violence official website

1978 establishments in Washington, D.C.
Domestic violence-related organizations in the United States
Non-profit organizations based in Colorado